David Ermini (born 1 November 1959) is an Italian lawyer and politician, vice president of the High Council of the Judiciary from 2018 to 2023.

Biography 
He studied at the Italian Liceo classico in Figline Valdarno, having Maurizio Sarri as his deskmate. 
Subsequently, he graduated in law at the University of Florence, Ermini began to work as a criminal lawyer. He entered politics in the late 1970s and became a city councilor of his hometown Figline Valdarno, elected with the Christian Democracy.

From 2004 to 2013, he was a provincial councilor at the Province of Florence, elected with The Daisy and later with the Democratic Party. From 2009 to 2013 he was also President of the Provincial Assembly of Florence.

After the 2013 election, Ermini was elected at the Chamber of Deputies. He was re-elected during the 2018 election, but left his deputy seat after his election at the High Council of the Judiciary. On 27 September 2018, Ermini was elected vice president of the High Council of the Judiciary.

He is considered to be very close to former Prime Minister Matteo Renzi.

References

External links 
Files about his parliamentary activities (in Italian): XVII, XVIII legislature.

1959 births
Living people
Christian Democracy (Italy) politicians
Italian People's Party (1994) politicians
Democracy is Freedom – The Daisy politicians
Democratic Party (Italy) politicians
20th-century Italian politicians
21st-century Italian politicians